The 2014–15 UTEP Miners basketball team represented the University of Texas at El Paso during the 2014–15 NCAA Division I men's basketball season. The Miners, led by fifth year head coach Tim Floyd, played their home games at the Don Haskins Center and were members of Conference USA. They finished the season 22–11, 13–5 in C-USA play to finish in a tie for the second place. They advanced to the semifinals of the C-USA tournament where they lost to Middle Tennessee. They were invited to the National Invitation Tournament where they lost in the first round to Murray State. UTEP averaged 8,458 fans per game, ranking 53rd nationally.

Previous season
The Miners finished the season 23–11, 12–4 in C-USA play to finish in fifth place. They advanced to the quarterfinals of the C-USA tournament where they lost to Southern Miss. They were invited to the College Basketball Invitational where they lost in the first round to Fresno State.

Departures

Incoming Transfers

Class of 2014 recruits

Roster

Schedule

|-
!colspan=9 style="background:#FF7F00; color:#000080;"| Exhibition

|-
!colspan=9 style="background:#FF7F00; color:#000080;"| Regular season

|-
!colspan=9 style="background:#FF7F00; color:#000080;"| Conference USA tournament

|-
!colspan=9 style="background:#FF7F00; color:#000080;"| NIT

See also
2014–15 UTEP Lady Miners basketball team

References

UTEP Miners men's basketball seasons
UTEP
UTEP